The 2022–23 Pyramids FC season is the club's 15th season in existence and the sixth consecutive season in the top flight of Egyptian football. In addition to the domestic league, Pyramids are participating in this season's editions of the Egypt Cup, the EFA Cup and the CAF Confederation Cup.

Overview 
About eight months after being hired, Pyramids fired coach Takis Gonias following a third heavy defeat.

Players

First-team squad

Out on loan

Transfers

In

Out

Pre-season and friendlies 

Pyramids held a training camp in Dubai, UAE from 24 September to 3 October.

Competitions

Overview

Egyptian Premier League

League table

Results summary

Results by round

Matches 
The league fixtures were announced on 9 October 2022.

Egypt Cup

EFA Cup

CAF Confederation Cup

Qualifying rounds 

The draw for the qualifying rounds was held on 9 August 2022.

Second round

Play-off round

Group stage 

The draw for the group stage was held on 12 December 2022.

References 

Pyramids FC
Pyramids